Bedwell Bay is a bay in British Columbia. It is a part of Indian Arm, and is located in the village municipality of Belcarra.

References

Bays of British Columbia
Belcarra